Enaphalodes rufulus or Red Oak Borer is a species of beetle in the family Cerambycidae. It was described by Haldeman in 1847.

References

Elaphidiini
Beetles described in 1847